There are twelve species of amphibians in Seychelles. These species include:

 Ptychadena mascareniensis (Mascarene grass frog)
 Sechellophryne gardineri  (Gardiner's Seychelles frog)
 Sechellophryne pipilodryas (Seychelles palm frog)
 Sooglossus sechellensis (Seychelles frog)
 Sooglossus thomasseti (Thomasset's Seychelles frog)
 Tachycnemis seychellensis (Seychelles treefrog)
 Hypogeophis (Seychelles caecilians)

References

External links

 Research and monitoring of Seychelles amphibians and reptiles

Seychelles
Seychelles
amphibians